Noé "El Chivo" Hernández Valentin (March 15, 1978 – January 16, 2013) was a Mexican race walker. Hernández won a silver medal at the 2000 Olympics and participated at the 2004 Olympics.

On December 30, 2012, Hernández was shot in the head, and left the hospital on January 8, 2013. Hernández died on January 16, 2013, in Chimalhuacán, State of Mexico due to a cardiac arrest.

Achievements

References

External links
 

1978 births
2013 deaths
Athletes (track and field) at the 2000 Summer Olympics
Athletes (track and field) at the 2004 Summer Olympics
Olympic silver medalists for Mexico
Olympic athletes of Mexico
Mexican male racewalkers
Sportspeople from the State of Mexico
Olympic silver medalists in athletics (track and field)
Medalists at the 2000 Summer Olympics
Shooting survivors